Buffalo Creek is a stream which runs through the United States commonwealths of Pennsylvania and West Virginia. It rises in East Finley Township, Washington County, Pennsylvania. 

Its tributaries are Brushy Run, Mill Run, Indian Camp Run, Buck Run, and Dutch Fork. These streams flow through the townships of East Findley, Donegal, Hopewell, and Buffalo, and the creek itself empties into the Ohio River at Wellsburg, West Virginia

The stream was possibly named for a Buffalo trace that once passed through the valley.

History
The Buffalo Creek area was first visited by Europeans in the 1600s by LaSalle. Later in 1749, Captain Celeron de Blainville sailed down the Ohio River planting lead plates to claim land for France.  These claims were then nullified during the Treaty of Paris of 1763.

Settlement of the watershed began in the early 1770s with James Caldwell. In 1773, Thomas Clark and some Germans settled along Dutch Fork, hence the name of the tributary. 

The mouth of Buffalo Creek was the location of Wells Fort. A number of other forts were located in the watershed and include Rail's Fort (1770s), Ramsey's Fort (1770s) - near Bethany, and a blockhouse called Coon's Fort east of Bethany.

A stockade, called Rices Stockade, was located near the present Town of Bethany. Rices Stockade was the scene of an Indian raid in 1782.

The Washington County part of the watershed had an additional eight forts (see reference for names).

The watershed was the location of a number of mills, the most prominent of which was Waugh's Mill (a flour mill) built in the 1790s. 

Oil was discovered in the watershed at Taylorstown, Pennsylvania in 1885.

Course
Buffalo Creek rises at Pleasant Grove, Pennsylvania, in Washington County and then follows a westerly course into West Virginia to join the Ohio River at Wellsburg, West Virginia.

Watershed
Buffalo Creek drains  of area, receives about 40.1 in/year of precipitation, has a wetness index of 316.09, and is about 80% forested.

Maps

See also
List of rivers of Pennsylvania

References

External links
Buffalo Creek Watershed Association
USGS Water Gauge at Wellsburg, West Virginia
Article on Early Mills on Buffalo Creek
Video of the last five miles of Buffalo Creek
Long Run Bridge over Counselmans Hill Road
Case Study of Flooding on Buffalo Creek
Buffalo Creek Watershed Management Plan

Rivers of Brooke County, West Virginia
Rivers of West Virginia
Rivers of Washington County, Pennsylvania
Rivers of Pennsylvania
Tributaries of the Ohio River